Iowa Highway 39 (Iowa 39) is a north–south state highway in western Iowa.  It begins at an intersection with U.S. Route 59 and Iowa Highway 141 on the western edge of Denison.  The route ends at its intersection with Iowa Highway 175 on the eastern side of Odebolt.

Route description
Iowa 39 begins on the west side of Denison, Iowa at an intersection with U.S. Highway 59 and Iowa Highway 141. Heading north-northwest, it runs parallel to the Boyer River between Denison and Deloit. At Deloit, the route straightens northward and travels  to Kiron. The route ends at Iowa Highway 175 in Odebolt.

History
Prior to 1969, the route that is now designated as Iowa 39 was designated as Iowa Highway 4.  This version of Iowa 4 once connected 
Hamburg and Spirit Lake along the current routings of U.S. Route 275, U.S. Highway 59, and U.S. Highway 71.  In 1969, when many routes were renumbered, Iowa 4 was redesignated as Iowa Highway 39.

Major intersections

References

External links

End of Iowa 39 at Iowa Highway Ends

039
Transportation in Crawford County, Iowa
Transportation in Sac County, Iowa